Geraldine Alejandra Galván Correa (born August 30, 1993, Mexico City, Mexico), is a Mexican actress and singer.

Career 
Geraldine Galván began her acting career at the age of four. Subsequently, she prepared in the center of artistic education of Televisa. She has participated in programs such as: El cubo de Donalú, La hora pico, El reto Burundis, Barney & Friends, Plaza Sésamo, Mujer, casos de la vida real and La familia P. Luche among others. She has participated in several soap operas such as: Amy, la niña de la mochila azul, Carita de ángel, María Belén, Pablo y Andrea and  Cómplices al rescate.

In 2001, she had her first role starring in television, in the TV series El noveno mandamiento. She was part of several soundtracks such as: Amy, la niña de la mochila azul vol. 1 and Cómplices al rescate.

In 2008 she joined the cast of Terminales, where she protayed Brenda. In that same year also participated in La rosa de Guadalupe. She has participated in films Mexicans as Abel and The Spy Next Door.

From the year 2011, she participated in several soap operas such as: Cuando me enamoro, Rafaela and Por ella soy Eva. In 2013 the producer Rosy Ocampo choose her to participate in the telenovela Mentir para vivir. In that same year she starred in the television series El Capo. In 2014, joined the Telemundo television network to stars as Greta de Rosas in Reina de corazones.

Filmography

Film

Television series

References

External links 

1993 births
Actresses from Mexico City
Mexican film actresses
Mexican telenovela actresses
Mexican television actresses
21st-century Mexican actresses
Living people
21st-century Mexican singers
21st-century Mexican women singers